A+ is a high-level, interactive, interpreted array programming language designed for numerically intensive applications, especially those found in financial applications.

History 

In 1985, Arthur Whitney created the A programming language to replace APL. Other developers at Morgan Stanley extended it to A+, adding a graphical user interface (GUI) and other language features. The GUI A+ was released in 1988.

Arthur Whitney went on to create a proprietary array language named K. Like J, K omits the APL character set. It lacks some of the perceived complexities of A+, such as the existence of statements and two different modes of syntax.

Features 

A+ provides an extended set of functions and operators, a graphical user interface with automatic synchronizing of widgets and variables, asynchronous executing of functions associated with variables and events, dynamic loading of user compiled subroutines, and other features. A+ runs on many Unix variants, including Linux. It is free and open source software released under a GNU General Public License. A newer GUI has not yet been ported to all supported platforms.

The A+ language implements the following changes to the APL language:
 an A+ function may have up to nine formal parameters
 A+ code statements are separated by semicolons, so a single statement may be divided into two or more physical lines
 The explicit result of a function or operator is the result of the last statement executed
 A+ implements an object called a dependency, which is a global variable (the dependent variable) and an associated definition that is like a function with no arguments. Values can be explicitly set and referenced in exactly the same ways as for a global variable, but they can also be set through the associated definition.

Interactive A+ development is primarily done in the Xemacs editor, through extensions to the editor. Because A+ code uses the original APL symbols, displaying A+ requires a font with those special characters; a font named kapl is provided on the web site for that purpose.

References

External links
, aplusdev.org

 APL programming language family
 Array programming languages
 Data-centric programming languages